Ellipsanime (formerly known as Le Studio Ellipse, Ellipse Programme and Ellipse Animation) is a French animation studio that produces television programs. It was founded in 1987.
In February 2000 it merged with Expand SA; Expand sold the company to Dargaud in 2003, and it became Ellipsanime in 2004. In 2014, Ellipsanime bought the assets of Moonscoop SA.

Ellipse has worked with many other animation companies, with one good example being the Canadian animation firm Nelvana Limited. Their early collaboration goes back to the television animated adaptation of the My Pet Monster franchise in 1987. The first official collaboration was in 1989 following the release of Nelvana and Ellipse's co-production, the Babar Movie in 1989. They then worked on the Babar animated series, revival from 2000. In 1991, Ellipse produced Doug, Nickelodeon's first original animated series, and produced in association with Jumbo Pictures and Nickelodeon Animation Studio. Nelvana has since co-produced on Ellipse's series from 1991 to 1996. Such examples Nelvana-Ellipse shows from the company would be, Babar, The Adventures of Tintin and Blazing Dragons. Ellipse (now Ellipsanime) is now a property of Dargaud, Inc.

On the occasion of the Annecy International Animation Film Festival in June 2022, the Media-Participations group announces the creation of an umbrella brand Ellipse Animation which brings together its production labels in France Ellipsanime Productions, Dargaud Media and Dupuis Edition & Audiovisual.

Films, TV shows, and specials
 Akissi
 Aliens Love Underpants
 Alta Donna
 Babar (co-production with Nelvana and Kodansha, revival only)
 Babar: The Movie (co-production with Nelvana)
 Blake and Mortimer 
 Blazing Dragons (co-production with Nelvana)
 Chicken Town
 Chumballs (co-production with Les Films de la Perrine and Araneo Belgium)
 Contraptus (fr) (a.k.a. Leonard)
 Cubitus (AKA: Wowser) 
 Doug (Seasons 2-4 only; co-production with Jumbo Pictures and Nickelodeon)
 Fennec (co-production with France 3 and Cactus Animation)
 Garfield Originals
 Harry & Bunnie
 Kong: The Animated Series (co-production with BKN International and M6)
 Miss BG (co-production with Telefilm Canada) 
 My Pet Monster (co-production with Nelvana)
 Nick & Perry (co-production with M6, TFC Trickompany Filmproduktion, Junior, and Westdeutscher Rundfunk)
 Rupert (co-production with Nelvana and YTV, seasons 1–3 only)
 Sonic Underground (animation, credited as Le Studio Ellipse) Sullivan (a.k.a. Clorophylle)
 Taratabong The Adventures of Tintin (co-production with Nelvana)
 The Funny Little Bugs (a.k.a. Les Droles de Petites B-tes; a.k.a. Funny Little Bugs)
 The Garfield Show The Jungle Book (co-production with DQ Entertainment International and ZDF Enterprises, season 3 only)
 The Magic Roundabout (a.k.a. Le Manege Enchante)
 The Neverending Story (co-production with CineVox and Nelvana)
 Yummy Toonies (a.k.a. Petit Creux) 
 Wonder Wai''

References

External links
 

French animation studios
Mass media companies established in 1987
Television production companies of France